Jordy Wehrmann (born 25 May 1999) is a Dutch professional footballer who plays as a midfielder for Eerste Divisie club ADO Den Haag, on loan from Luzern.

Club career

Feyenoord
Having been at Feyenoord's academy since the age of 7, he joined FC Dordrecht on a one-year loan on 20 August 2019. He made his debut for Dordrecht on 13 September 2019 in a 1–1 draw against FC Volendam. Over the course of the 2019–20 season, he made 22 appearances, scoring once.

On 25 October 2020, Wehrmann made his debut for Feyenoord in the Eredivisie match against RKC Waalwijk. He made 9 appearances for Feyenoord during the 2020–21 season.

Luzern
On 3 February 2021, Wehrmann joined Luzern on loan until the end of the season. Whilst on loan at Luzern, Wehrmann made 23 appearances and scored one goal. He also played in the 2020–21 Swiss Cup final as Luzern won 3–1 and were crowned Swiss Cup champions. He joined Luzern permanently on a three-year contract for an undisclosed fee on 30 June 2021.

On 9 July 2022, Wehrmann was sent on a one-season loan to ADO Den Haag.

International career
Born in the Netherlands, Wehrmann is of Indonesian descent through his maternal grandparents. Wehrmann has played for the Netherlands at under-17, under-19 and under-20 levels.

Career statistics

Honours
Luzern
 Swiss Cup: 2020–21

References

External links
 
 

1999 births
Living people
Footballers from The Hague
Dutch footballers
Netherlands youth international footballers
Dutch people of Indonesian descent
Association football midfielders
Feyenoord players
FC Dordrecht players
FC Luzern players
ADO Den Haag players
Eredivisie players
Eerste Divisie players
Swiss Super League players
Dutch expatriate footballers
Expatriate footballers in Switzerland